For Certain is the second EP by American rapper Bia, which was released on December 11, 2020, through Epic Records. The EP was supported by the singles; "Free Bia (1st Day Out)", "Cover Girl", "Same Hands" featuring Lil Durk, "Skate", and "Whole Lotta Money", which were released throughout 2020 and 2021 respectively. For Certain also features guest appearances from Lil Jon, Doe Boy and 42 Dugg. A deluxe edition was released on October 22, 2021 and was preceded by the singles "Whole Lotta Money (Remix)" featuring Nicki Minaj and "Besito" featuring G Herbo.

Background and development 
In 2014, Bia signed a joint record deal with RCA Records and Pharrell's label I Am Other. During this time she released a mixtape titled, #CholaSeason in 2014, as well as the Nice Girls Finish Last: Cuidado EP in 2018. In 2019, Bia would separate from the labels claiming she was prevented from releasing music. After her first independently released single "One Minute Warning" in August 2019, Bia would be featured on the Russ collaboration, "Best on Earth" in October 2019. The song would peak at number 42 on the Billboard Hot 100 and be certified Platinum by the RIAA.

In early 2020, Bia would sign a new record deal with Epic Records and started releasing single throughout the year in anticipation for the EP. Bia initially announced the project's title to be "Rich Tiers", but the title was later changed in favour of "For Certain", its title taken from the hook of the single "Cover Girl". On December 8, Bia took to her social media accounts to announce the project and revealed the cover art. The following day, Bia revealed the tracklisting.

Singles 
Bia released the lead single, "Free Bia (1st Day Out)" on March 27, 2020. The song discusses Bia's experience with her previous record label and how she was "shelved" for multiple years, as well as celebrating her newfound freedom.

The second single, "Cover Girl", was released on April 3, 2020, alongside a "quarantine" music video. The song was serviced to Urban and Rhythmic radios on April 14.

The third and fourth singles, "Same Hands" featuring Lil Durk and "Skate" were released in September and November that same year. The latter later was chosen as the Stanley Cup playoffs theme song following a reworked version of the song  titled the "NHL Mix".

A music video for "Whole Lotta Money" was released on April 8, 2021 and impacted Rhythmic radios on May 18, 2021 as the fifth single from the EP. The song peaked at number three on the Bubbling Under Hot 100 chart. A remix with Nicki Minaj was released on July 9, 2021 and debuted at No. 16 on the Billboard Hot 100 chart, becoming Bia's first and highest charting song as a lead artist. The remix pushed the mixtape to debut at No. 64 on the Billboard 200, becoming Bia's first entry on the chart.

Music and lyrics 
According to AllMusic, Bia "expresses moments of everyday glamor" such as putting on jewelry "just to go to the bodega." She also "projects a calm, cool-headed attitude which counters her hard, aggressive lyrics" throughout the EP.

In "Bia Bia", she "launches into razor sharp verses before Lil Jon crunks up the hook with his instantly recognizable delivery." In "Skate", she delivers "clever" lyrics about making money and leveling up on a "wavy" trap beat. "Same Hands" was inspired by the idea that "no matter how you sin, you can still be close to God." In "Cover Girl", Bia shows her confidence on a "magnetic" beat. 

In "Besito", she exposes her accomplishments to inspire girls and women in a "contemporary hip-hop style that reflects how global her music is." "Can't Touch This" is a "surprisingly smooth club anthem" that samples Kelis' "Milkshake" with lyrics inspired by MC Hammer's "Can't Touch This". "Motionless" is an emotional "diary kind of a song."

Critical reception 

Richardine Bartee of Grungecake wrote that "if there’s anything Bia understands, it is how to pick the right production and write a hook." Quincy of Ratings Game Music wrote that "while I do not think that BIA puts up dynamic performances on the EP, I do think that she shows flashes of solidness rapping-wise."

Awards and nominations

Track listing

Notes
 All track titles are stylized in all uppercase

Charts

Release history

References 

Album chart usages for Billboard200
Album chart usages for BillboardRandBHipHop
2020 EPs